Sonkovo is central commodity-passenger railway station of the Moscow branch of the Oktyabrskaya Railway on a joint with Northern Railway, with movement in four directions. The station is located in the urban-type settlement of Sonkovo of Tver Oblast, Russia The railway station and locomotive depot have been defining factors of the settlement's development.

References 
 

Railway stations in Tver Oblast
Railway stations in the Russian Empire opened in 1870